The 1903 Oklahoma Sooners football team represented the University of Oklahoma as an independent during the 1903 college football season. In their second year under head coach Mark McMahon, the Sooners compiled a 5–4–3 record, and outscored their opponents by a combined total of 93 to 35.

Schedule

References

Oklahoma
Oklahoma Sooners football seasons
Oklahoma Sooners football